IOS XE is a release train of Cisco Systems' widely deployed Internetworking Operating System (IOS), introduced with the ASR 1000 series.

It is built on Linux and provides a distributed software architecture that moves many operating system responsibilities out of the IOS process and has a copy of IOS running as a separate process. Since it runs a copy of IOS, all CLI commands are the same between Cisco IOS and IOS XE, in contrast to IOS XR, which has a completely different code base and whose developers implemented a different CLI command set.

Releases
IOS XE is released separately for ASR 1000 and Catalyst 3850.

Differences between IOS and IOS XE
Cisco IOS is a monolithic operating system running directly on the hardware while IOS XE is a combination of a Linux kernel and a monolithic application (IOSd) that runs on top of this kernel. On the other hand, IOS XR is based on QNX (since version 5.0 it's also based on linux), where the IOSd application has been separated into many different applications. While IOS XE (IOSd) and IOS share a lot of the same code, IOS XR is a completely different code base.

Since IOS XE has IOSd running as an application on top of Linux, it becomes possible to also run different applications on the hardware, a good example of this is running Wireshark on a switch. Another example is the Cisco IOS XE Open Service Containers.

See also 
 Cisco NX-OS

References

External links
 Cisco Content Hub
 Cisco Feature Navigator
 

Cisco products